= Harnam Singh Wala =

- village
- Country: India
- State: Punjab

Languages
  - Official: Punjabi
- Time zone: UTC+5:30 (IST)

Harnam Singh Wala is a village located in the district of Bathinda, in the Indian state of Punjab.
